Bana Zardeh is a village in Beyranvand-e Jonubi Rural District, Bayravand District, Khorramabad County, Lorestan Province, Iran. At the 2006 census, its population was 55, in 11 families.

References 

Towns and villages in Khorramabad County